Michigan National Forest was established by the U.S. Forest Service in Michigan on February 11, 1909 with . On July 1, 1915 Marquette National Forest was added.  On February 12, 1931 the name was changed to Marquette National Forest. The lands presently exist in Hiawatha National Forest.

References

External links
Forest History Society
Listing of the National Forests of the United States and Their Dates (from the Forest History Society website) Text from Davis, Richard C., ed. Encyclopedia of American Forest and Conservation History. New York: Macmillan Publishing Company for the Forest History Society, 1983. Vol. II, pp. 743-788.

 

Former National Forests of the United States